Stob na Boine Druim-fhinn is a mountain in the Arrochar Alps in the Argyll Highlands. The mountain itself is part of the group of mountains within the Arrochar Alps to the west of Loch Goil. The mountain can be seen from Lochgoilhead.

On 17 January 1949 a United States Army Air Forces, Boeing B-29 Superfortress (44-62279) of 31st Test and Evaluation Squadron, was on a flight from RAF Scampton, England to Reykjavík, Iceland. At 9:50am the B-29 crashed into the side of Stob na Boine Druim-fhinn killing all twenty passengers and crew. The cause of the crash was not determined, but the adverse weather and heavy icing were deemed to be contributory factors.

References

Mountains and hills of Argyll and Bute
1949 disasters in the United Kingdom
Aviation accidents and incidents locations in Scotland